"I'll Never Forgive My Heart" is a song written by Ronnie Dunn, his wife Janine, and Dean Dillon. It was recorded by American country music duo Brooks & Dunn that peaked at number 6 on the Billboard Hot Country Singles & Tracks chart. It was released in November 1994 as the second single from their album Waitin' on Sundown.

Critical reception
Deborah Evans Price, of Billboard magazine reviewed the song favorably, calling it one of Dunn's "most effective honky-tonk vocals on this sawdust-floor slow number about an uninvited heartache."

Chart positions
"I'll Never Forgive My Heart" debuted at number 58 on the U.S. Billboard Hot Country Singles & Tracks for the week of November 12, 1994.

Year-end charts

References

1994 singles
1994 songs
Brooks & Dunn songs
Songs written by Dean Dillon
Songs written by Ronnie Dunn
Song recordings produced by Scott Hendricks
Song recordings produced by Don Cook
Arista Nashville singles